Collinsworth may refer to:

Cris Collinsworth (born 1959), American football player and broadcaster
Eden Collinsworth (born 1952), American author and businesswoman
James Collinsworth (1806–1838), American-born lawyer and political figure in the Republic of Texas
Kyle Collinsworth (born 1991), American basketball player